Mantash may refer to:
 Mets Mantash, Armenia
 Pokr Mantash, Armenia